Nguni is an African surname. Notable people with the surname include:

Jacob Nguni (1956–2015), Cameroonian singer, high-life guitarist, and activist
Sylvester Nguni, Zimbabwean Minister of State
Nguni, South Africa educational learner
Ayarh, South Africa social worker

Surnames of African origin